Bharathan (14 November 1946 – 30 July 1998) was an Indian film maker, artist, and art director. Bharathan is noted for being the founder of a new school of film making in Malayalam cinema, along with Padmarajan and K. G. George, in the 1980s, which created films that were widely received while also being critically acclaimed. A train of directors, and screenwriters followed this school onto the 1990s including Sibi Malayil, Kamal, Lohithadas and Jayaraj.

Early life
He was born at Enkakkad near Wadakkancherry, in present-day Thrissur district of Kerala, India.

Career

Art direction
After completing his diploma from the College of Fine Arts, Thrissur, Bharathan entered films as an art director through the Malayalam film Gandharavakshetram (1972), directed by A. Vincent, which also happened to be ons of the first films where actor Thilakan played a noticeable role. He was inspired by his uncle P. N. Menon, an established director. After working as an art director and assistant director in a few films, he made his directorial debut in 1975 with Prayanam, which was based on Padmarajan's script. It also marked the rise of two early proponents of middle-stream Malayalam cinema.

Film direction
Bharathan directed over 40 films in Malayalam and Tamil. Starting his career in 1975 with Prayanam, Bharathan rode to fame with his off-beat Thakara, a film about a dumb-witted central character who falls in love with the village beauty. Some of his other memorable films include Rathinirvedam, Chamaram, Paalangal, Amaram, and Vaishali.

His association with Padmarajan led to films including Rathi Nirvedam and Thakara. Rathi Nirvedam was a treatment of teenage sexual angst. In Thakara, he deals with life and longings of an intellectually disabled youth and his association with the society.

In the early 1980s he made several notable movies like Chamaram , Marmaram ,  Paalangal , Ormakkayi , Kattathe Kilikkoodu,    Kathodu Kathoram  and many more. They did well in theaters and set the trend for meaningful mainstream cinema. Other noted directors followed suit. It was the romantic era of Malayalam cinema.

Not all of Bharathan's films skirted with bold themes and controversy. In Oru Minnaaminunginte Nurunguvettam (1987), he tells the poignant story of a childless couple in their post retirement life. It deals with the isolation and loneliness that comes with old age. The film was a departure from Bharathan's usual style and proved to be a major commercial hit while garnering critical acclaim, too. 

His Vaisali (1988) is widely regarded as a modern-day masterpiece in Malayalam cinema. Scripted by the iconic Malayalam novelist M. T. Vasudevan Nair, it was an adaptation of a sub-story told in the epic Mahabharatha. Another movie born from their association was Thazhvaram. The subject was revenge, a theme quite uncharacteristic of Bharathan movies. The style was inspired by classic Westerns with a brooding, reticent central character and expansive shots of barren landscape.another movie was Amaram which was written by A. K. Lohithadas starring Mammootty which was milestone movie of malayalam movie of 1990 s. 

Even though he was not known to cater to the star-centric system, Bharathan was instrumental in bringing together the two screen icons of Tamil cinema Sivaji Ganesan and Kamal Hassan in the Tamil film Thevar Magan which won critical acclaim and box office success. Sivaji gave an uncharacteristically restrained yet brilliant performance. The movie won several national awards and was remade into many regional languages (most notably Virasat in Hindi).

His more experimental films include Aaravam, more an arthouse than commercial venture, and Nidra, about the plight of a woman who is in love with a mentally deranged man. His film "Nidra" was remade by his son, film director Sidharth Bharathan. "Rathinirvedam" originally directed by Bharathan, which was a noted film was also remade by another famous director T K Rajeev Kumar with Swetha Menon in the lead.

Apart from film direction, he also wrote lyrics and tuned songs for his films. (e.g., lyrics for "Thaaram Valkannadi Nokki" in Keli and "Tharum Thalirum Mizhipootti" in Chilambu or title song for Kathodu Kathoram). He collaborated with writer P. R. Nathan in Keli.

Filmmaking style

Bharathan's films were known for their realistic portrayal of rural life in Kerala. Melodrama and escapism, often an integral part of mainstream cinema in India, were usually absent in his films. He also managed to steer clear of the "star-centric" culture, prevalent in Indian cinema, throughout his career. His later films did involve major movie stars but usually without compromising on plot or narrative. Bharathan, along with Padmarajan and K. G. George were largely responsible for introducing a counter culture of meaningful mainstream cinema which often tread the middle path between art-house and commercial cinema. This movement was often called the "middle of the road cinema". Bharathan's films were known for their visually appealing shot compositions. His background as a painter enabled him to create frames that were often credited for their visual beauty. Natural props and nature itself often became important characters in his films (like the railway track in Palangal, or the sea in Amaram). Bharathan is one of the few Indian directors known to use an elaborate story-board system for filming. He also often designed the posters for his films.

Several of his early films were known for their bold portrayal of sexual themes. His films often defied social conventions and norms about man-woman relationships. Rathinirvedam was the sexual-coming-of-age story of the relationship between a teenager and an older woman while Chamaram dealt with the tumultuous affair between a student and his college lecturer. In Kattathe Kilikkoodu an elderly, married Professor falls for his student. Kaathodu Kaathoram was about the social ostracism of a woman who has an adulterous relationship.

The latter half of Bharathan's career saw a distinct change in film making style characterized by a wider canvas, more attention to detail with more distinct focus on narrative style (e.g., Vaishali, Amaram, Thaazhvaaram, and Thevar Magan). Some critics argue that this quest for technical excellence was at the expense of the quality of thematic content. Films like Vaishali and Amaram (where he collaborated with acclaimed cinematographer Madhu Ambat) set a new benchmark for cinematographic excellence in Malayalam and Indian Cinema. Thaazhvaaram was stylistically inspired by classic Hollywood Westerns though the theme and backdrop were distinctly original.

His last few films (Manjeeradhwani, Devaraagam and Churam) were received moderately by critics.

Death
Bharatan died at a private hospital in Chennai on 30 July 1998 at the age of 52 following prolonged illness. His last film was Churam, which released a year before his death. His mortal remains were brought back to his ancestral home at Wadakkancherry and cremated with full state honours.

Personal life

Bharathan was married to theatre and film actress K. P. A. C. Lalitha with whom he associated in a lot of films before and after marriage. They had two children - Sreekutty, a former child actress, and Sidharth Bharathan, a film actor and director.

Filmography

Awards

National Film Awards
 1992: National Film Award for Best Feature Film in Tamil  Thevar Magan

Filmfare Awards South
 1979: Filmfare Award for Best Director – Malayalam Thakara
 1980: Filmfare Award for Best Director – Malayalam Chamaram
 1984: Filmfare Award for Best Director – Malayalam Ithiri Poove Chuvannapoove

Kerala State Film Awards

References

External links

 
:ml:ഭരതന്‍ (ചലച്ചിത്ര സംവിധായകന്‍)
 Festschrift by Mathrubhumi
 
 cinemaofmalayalam.net: Profile
 prd.kerala.gov.in: Malayalam Cinema Introduction

Tamil film directors
1946 births
1998 deaths
Film directors from Kerala
Malayalam film directors
Kerala State Film Award winners
People from Thrissur district
Filmfare Awards South winners
20th-century Indian film directors
Film people from Kerala
Indian art directors
20th-century Indian designers
Screenwriters from Kerala
Film musicians from Kerala
20th-century Indian screenwriters
Male actors from Thrissur